The Great Western Railway Waverley Class were 4-4-0 broad gauge steam locomotives for express passenger train work.

The class was introduced into service between February and June 1855, and withdrawn between February 1872 and November 1876. From about 1865, the Waverley Class was known as the Abbot Class.

The names are inspired by the Waverley novels of Sir Walter Scott.

Locomotives
 Abbott (1855–1876)
 The Abbot is one of the Waverley novels.

 Antiquary (1855–1876)
The Antiquary is one of the Waverley novels.

 Coeur de Lion
Coeur de Lion is the nickname of King Richard I of England, who appears in  Sir Walter Scott's novel The Talisman.

 Ivanhoe (1855–1876)
Ivanhoe is one of the Waverley novels.

 Lalla Rookh (1855–1872)
Lalla-Rookh was a poem by Thomas Moore.

 Pirate (1855–1876)
The Pirate is one of the Waverley novels.

 Red Gauntlet (1855–1876)
Redgauntlet is one of the Waverley novels.

 Rob Roy (1855–1872)
Rob Roy is the title of one of the Waverley novels and the nickname of Robert Roy MacGregor.

 Robin Hood (1855–1876)
Robin Hood was an English folk hero.

 Waverley (1855–1876)
Waverley  is the first title in the Waverley series of novels.

References

External links
 Waverley class 4-4-0 steam locomotive, c 1855 - drawing from Sir Daniel Gooch's sketchbook
 A Victorian railway accident - photograph of Rob Roy about to be re-railed following an accident

Waverley
4-4-0 locomotives
Broad gauge (7 feet) railway locomotives
Railway locomotives introduced in 1855
Passenger locomotives